John Thomas Godfray Hope Doeg (December 7, 1908 – April 27, 1978) was a male tennis player from the United States.

In August 1929 Doeg won the singles title at the Seabright Invitational defeating Richard Norris Williams in three straight sets. About a year later, he fulfilled his promise and won his first and only major singles tournament, the 1930 U.S. National Championships at Forest Hills, defeating Frank Hunter in the quarterfinals, Bill Tilden in the semifinals and Frank Shields in the final in four sets. He proceeded to reach a career-high singles world ranking of No. 4 in the same year.

In 1962, he was inducted into the International Tennis Hall of Fame.

Doeg was the son of tennis player Violet Sutton and the nephew of Wimbledon and U.S. National singles tennis champion May Sutton. Born in Mexico, he became a U.S. citizen in 1933.

Playing style

Although his name is not well known today Doeg in his heyday often was considered among the premier servers in tennis history:

Don Budge in his book Budge on Tennis later stated the same sentiment:

Budge, however, was careful to note the shortcomings of the rest of Doeg's game. In his 1969 memoir Budge observes "John never achieved the greatest stature in the sport because many facets of his game, his ground strokes, for instance, were somewhat lacking," then proclaimed Doeg "one of the most effective servers of all time":

Grand Slam finals

Singles (1 title)

Doubles (2 titles, 1 runner-up)

Publication
In 1931, he wrote an educational tennis book titled "Elements of Lawn Tennis", with sportswriter Allison Danzig.

References

External links
 
 
 
 

1908 births
1978 deaths
American male tennis players
Sportspeople from Sonora
People from Guaymas
Stanford Cardinal men's tennis players
International Tennis Hall of Fame inductees
United States National champions (tennis)
Grand Slam (tennis) champions in men's singles
Grand Slam (tennis) champions in men's doubles